This Bloody Blundering Business is a half-hour documentary film released in 1971.  It examines the American occupation of the Philippines, following the Spanish–American War. The film is characterized by its ragtime music combined with dramatically understated revelations of the attitudes of the Americans towards the native Filipinos.

Plot
According to the film, the Americans came to the Philippines for one reason: to civilize the people. William McKinley's Benevolent assimilation was, he said, a way to educate and civilize their "little brown brothers", the Filipinos, and leave the country once it is ready to handle its own government.

Director
Peter Davis, born in 1933, is a British-Canadian film director and producer whose films include, among many others, South Africa: the White Laager, a history of Afrikaner nationalism, Remember Mandela, which was shown on the first day of the Democratic National Convention in Atlanta in 1988, and Anatomy of Violence, which was made in conjunction with Stokely Carmichael and Allen Ginsberg.  (Peter Davis is to be distinguished from the American documentary film director of the same name, who is known for his direction of the 1974 documentary Hearts and Minds).

See also
 List of American films of 1971

References

External links

American short documentary films
1971 documentary films
Black-and-white documentary films
American silent short films
History of the Philippines (1898–1946)
Documentary films about war
1971 films
Spanish–American War films
Documentary films about United States history
Documentary films about imperialism
Films without speech
1970s short documentary films
1971 short films
Films set in the Philippines
American black-and-white films
1970s American films